Julius "Jules" Nuninger (born 21 May 1874, date of death unknown) was a German gymnast. He competed in the men's individual all-around event at the 1900 Summer Olympics.

References

External links

1874 births
Year of death missing
German male artistic gymnasts
Olympic gymnasts of Germany
Gymnasts at the 1900 Summer Olympics
Sportspeople from Mulhouse
Place of death missing